V28, or V.28, may refer to:
 Fokker V.28, a German World War I fighter aircraft
 Wick (hieroglyph), an Egyptian hieroglyph
 V.28, a telecommunications recommendation of the ITU-T
 Norwegian blackmetal band V28 (music group)